David A. Steinberg (born 1970) is the founder and chief executive officer of Zeta Global, one of multiple successful companies that he has founded. Zeta Global is a big-data and artificial intelligence driven marketing company that integrates data, technology, and marketing technology, aiming to help brands acquire, grow and retain customers.

Steinberg is a serial entrepreneur, one of few who have built multiple companies that are worth $1 Billion dollars, and do more than $100 Million in annual sales. His net worth has been estimated at $750 Million Dollars.

Steinberg also serves as chairman and co-founder of On Demand Pharma and Caivis Investment corporation.

Early life

Career
In 1993, David Steinberg founded Sterling Cellular, Inc. in the basement of his house in Bethesda, Maryland with the use of credit cards and a parental loan. Sterling Cellular grossed $1.3 million in sales in its first year in business. It was a business that sold cellular phones. Sterling offered free, timed delivery and a warranty/repair program and a free loaner phone program from its third month. By 1997 Sterling Cellular grew to 12 retail locations and $22 million in sales.

In 1999, Steinberg broke up Sterling Cellular by selling off the retail chain and telemarketing operations of Sterling Cellular and founding Inphonic. Over a seven-year period, Inphonic grew into the largest seller of new cell phones on the internet with over $300 million in revenue. As the public face for Inphonic, he was praised for creating and growing the online business that dominates online sales for cell phones.  
When the financial crisis of 2007–2010 began in 2007 with the credit squeeze on all companies, Inphonic suffered. In November 2007, after Steinberg resigned as CEO and chairman of the board, InPhonic filed a Chapter 11 petition in the United States Bankruptcy Court for the District of Delaware. In December, InPhonic was acquired by Versa Capital Management and relaunched as Simplexity.

After Inphonic, Steinberg secured support to start a new corporation, CAIVIS Acquisition Corp. According to their website, CAIVIS Acquisition Corp is an investment firm that invests in start up technology and marketing companies and helps them to maximize their growth using Caivis's capital and experience.[12] The goal is to invest in small companies that typically command a price–earnings ratio (PE) of 5 while selling to larger companies that command a PE of 10.[13]

In 2011, Steinberg started XL Marketing Corp with John Sculley, the company is [10] today known as Zeta Global. On January 30, 2014, Steinberg moderated a marketing panel hosted by Zeta  on the changes in advertising and marketing over the years,[14] using Apple's 1984 commercial as a benchmark.[15] John Sculley was a panelist with advertising executive David Sable, Global CEO of Young & Rubicam; Jessica Gelman, Vice President of Customer Marketing & Strategy; The Kraft Group—the owners of the New England Patriots; and Hooman Radfar, chairman and co-founder of marketing firm AddThis.[16]

Zeta Global 

Zeta Global, (formerly Zeta Interactive) was originally built through several small companies specializing in different facets of online marketing and CRM that were acquired and combined to create the firm which has now grown into a full-service big data, customer acquisition, and customer relationship management services. Originally called, XL Marketing in June 2012 it raised capital of $70 million. It acquired rival Intela  and the Adchemy Actions division
 with that $70 million. In July 2015, the company raised $125 million from Blackstone's GSO Capital Partners to grow its business through acquisitions
  of large data and AI companies.
 The company has been listed by Forbes Magazine as one of America's 50 Most Promising Private Companies and referred to as a 'Unicorn,' a "billion-dollar startup".

Zeta calls its approach to data-driven marketing "precision marketing".	 Again in 2015, Steinberg helmed Zeta Global as it acquired the customer relationship management division of eBay's Enterprise operation, in a deal that sources near the company said was worth US$80–90 million. Steinberg said Zeta is finally on its way to becoming “the largest customer lifecycle management platform."
In April 2017, Steinberg continued building Zeta Global with a $140 million fundraise with funds coming from GPI Capital and Franklin Square Capital Partners. Forbes reported that sources are valuing the company at close to $1.3 billion.
Steinberg said the company is considering an IPO. Zeta doesn't sell its data to marketers or other outside companies but uses it to develop its consumer insights. Data is effectively the electricity that powers their technology platform. Zeta Global has the industry's third largest data set (2.4B+ identities), next to Google and Facebook, powered by demographic, locational, behavioral, transactional, and predictive signals. Zeta Global announced on March 1, 2021, that the company had raised $222.5 Million in their most recent debt financing funding round. Investors in this latest funding round included lead investor BofA Securities with Credit Suisse, Morgan Stanley, and Barclays.

Zeta Global went public on the New York Stock exchange on June 10, 2021.

Personal
Steinberg is married and has four children. Steinberg has served on the Washington & Jefferson College Board of Trustees.

References

External links
 Interview With David Steinberg
 CAIVIS Acquisition Corp
 Inphonic rebate
 Travel Industry's Secret Digital Weapon -- Big Data 
 Even At Cannes, Creativity Is No Longer Enough
 5 Lessons I've Learned From My Mentor: Former Apple CEO John Sculley 
 How big data has become accessible to everyone

Living people
1970 births
American retail chief executives
People from Washington, D.C.
Washington & Jefferson College trustees
Washington & Jefferson College alumni